The men's 1500 metres event  at the 1999 IAAF World Indoor Championships was held on March 6–7.

Medalists

Results

Heats
First 3 of each heat (Q) and next 3 fastest (q) qualified for the final.

Final

References
Results

1500
1500 metres at the World Athletics Indoor Championships